This is a list of notable events in country music that took place in the year 1935.

Events 
sales remained approximately 14% of 1929 levels

Top Hillbilly (Country) Recordings

The following songs were extracted from records included in Joel Whitburn's Pop Memories 1890-1954, record sales reported on the "Discography of American Historical Recordings" website, and other sources as specified. Numerical rankings are approximate, they are only used as a frame of reference.

Births 
 January 8 – Elvis Presley, "The King" and cross-genre singer (died 1977).
 April 5 – Warner Mack, countrypolitan-styled singer-songwriter from the late 1950s through late 1960s.
 August 2 – Hank Cochran, songwriter best known for writing hits by Patsy Cline, Ray Price, Eddy Arnold and others (died 2010).
 September 25 – Royce Kendall, father half of The Kendalls (died 1998).
 September 29 – Jerry Lee Lewis, pianist whose successfully fused honky tonk with rock music, making him one of the genre's most successful performers of the 1950s through 1980s; cousin of Mickey Gilley and Jimmy Swaggart.
 November 30 – George Richey, songwriter and record producer; husband of Tammy Wynette (died 2010).

Deaths 
 August 15 – Will Rogers, 55, beloved humorist who had appeal with both country and popular music audiences (plane crash).

Further reading 
 Kingsbury, Paul, "Vinyl Hayride: Country Music Album Covers 1947–1989," Country Music Foundation, 2003
 Millard, Bob, "Country Music: 70 Years of America's Favorite Music," HarperCollins, New York, 1993
 Whitburn, Joel. "Top Country Songs 1944–2005 – 6th Edition." 2005.

References

Country
Country music by year